Trigonometry is a branch of mathematics that studies relationships between side lengths and angles of triangles.

Trig also may refer to:
 Trig functions
 TriG (syntax), a format for storing and transmitting Resource Description Framework (RDF) data
 Trig points, also known as triangulation stations
 Trig Paxson Van Palin, son of former Alaska Governor Sarah Palin
 Trigedasleng, or Trig, a language used on the TV series The 100

See also 
 Spherical trigonometry
 Non-euclidean geometry
 Celestial navigation